Treasure Island is a 1950 adventure film produced by RKO-Walt Disney British Productions, adapted from Robert Louis Stevenson's 1883 novel of the same name. Directed by Byron Haskin, it stars Bobby Driscoll as Jim Hawkins and Robert Newton as Long John Silver. Treasure Island was Disney's first completely live-action film and the first screen version of Treasure Island made in color. It was filmed in the United Kingdom on location and at Denham Film Studios, Buckinghamshire.

Plot
In the West Coast of England in 1765, a young boy called Jim Hawkins lives with his mother in a tiny country inn which they run. Captain William Bones, a sickly lodger, gives Jim a treasure map after being visited by two pirates, the second of whom gives the captain a note marked with the black spot, and sends him for help with a mysterious promise to share. Jim returns with Squire Trelawney and Dr. Livesey, only to find Bones dead at the inn, and Jim shows Trelawney the map. Trelawney recognizes the map as belonging to the buccaneer Captain Flint and bankrolls a voyage to discover the pirate's lost treasure. Trelawney hires Captain Smollett and his ship, the Hispaniola, bringing along Dr Livesey as the ship's doctor and Jim as the cabin boy.

Before departure, Trelawney is taken in by Long John Silver, a one-legged innkeeper, who agrees to gather a crew. Silver strikes up a friendship with Jim and joins the expedition as the ship's cook. Smollett is concerned about the crew, especially because the nature of their journey is common knowledge.

At sea, Silver convinces Jim to acquire some rum, which he uses to get the first mate, Mr Arrow, drunk so that he is washed overboard in a storm.

Jim overhears Silver and the crew's plan to mutiny, discovering that the seamen hired by Silver are Captain Flint's old crew. Jim reveals the treachery to Smollett, who asks Jim to stay friends with Silver to learn more. Upon reaching Treasure Island, Silver offers to tow the ship to a safer anchorage, using two of the ship's rowboats. While the ship is being towed, one of Silver's men, Merry, leads a mutiny on the ship. Smollett, having been warned of the plot by Jim, can hold them off with the few men loyal to him and imprisons the mutineers below decks. Silver cuts the rowboats from the Hispaniola and heads for shore with the rest of his men, taking Jim as a hostage. Smollett, Trelawney, and Livesey go ashore after them, leaving two guards on the ship.

On the island, Jim escapes and meets Ben Gunn, marooned by Flint five years ago. Gunn shows Jim the boat he's built, then leads him to Flint's stockade, where he meets up with Smollett and the others. Meanwhile, Merry escapes, takes the ship and raises the Jolly Roger. Silver returns to the Hispaniola, arms his men with muskets and makes plans to take the stockade. Short of men, Silver attempts to parlay with Smollett, but when he is rebuffed, Silver calls his men to attack. The assault on the stockade fails, but Silver wounds Smollett. Although seemingly protected by the stockade, Smollett surmises that, with the morning tide, Silver could move the Hispaniola into cannon range and level the fort.

Jim takes Gunn's boat and cuts the Hispaniola'''s anchor rope. The pirate Israel Hands discovers Jim and chases him up into the ship's rigging. Hands injures Jim's arm with a throwing knife but is killed by the boy's pistol. The Hispaniola runs aground, Jim strikes the Jolly Roger and hoists the Union Jack. Slowed by his wound, which becomes badly infected by swamp water, it takes him all night to get back to the stockade, which is unguarded. Inside, Jim searches for the doctor to tend his wound, but the man asleep under Livesey's coat is Long John Silver. Jim faints on the spot. Silver finds the map on him as his men wake up. Merry wants Jim dead, but Silver states he wants to trade him for the map, which his men believe is with Smollett. The men go outside to vote, pirate-style. From the stockade's lookout, while calling for Livesey, Silver sees that the ship's aground, flying the Union Jack, and believes that Smollett's party has recaptured the ship. The other pirates give Silver the black spot, but he refuses to acknowledge it. Rattled, they let him bargain with Livesey, who has come to treat Jim's infected wound, for the map.

Silver secretly barters with Livesey for leniency in court, inadvertently revealing to him that the ship is no longer under his control. Livesey agrees only when Jim refuses to try and escape with him since Silver saved his life by calling for Livesey. Livesey leaves, and Silver returns with Jim, flaunting the map to convince his men that his bargain was successful. The pirates are overjoyed and take back the black spot, then proceed on a gruelling treasure hunt. When they finally reach the spot where the treasure — supposed to be 700,000 pounds — is supposed to be buried, they discover instead an empty pit, save for one guinea. The pirates turn on Silver, who manages to kill three of them before Smollett's men appear to defeat the rest. Greeting Silver, Gunn reveals that he dug up Flint's treasure and has stashed it in a cave. 
 
Despite keeping his end of the bargain, Captain Smollett still wants Silver taken back for trial in England for his mutiny. Hawkins, Trelawney and two others take Silver to the Hispaniola aboard a rowboat loaded with a few chests of treasure. Silver snatches Jim's pistol and forces Trelawney and the others out of the boat but makes Jim stay to steer him out of the cove. Jim instead beaches him on a sandbar, and Silver orders him to push him off at pistol point, though Jim bravely refuses. Silver is unable to carry out his threat to shoot and drops the pistol in the water, attempting to push the boat off on his own. Seeing Silver struggle, Jim helps him, waving a hesitant farewell as Silver rows away with the treasure and bids him farewell in return.

Cast

ProductionTreasure Island was produced by RKO-Walt Disney British Productions, Ltd., a joint-venture owned by Walt Disney Productions and RKO Radio Pictures. Walt Disney had been planning an adaptation of Treasure Island, originally intended to be animated, since the 1930s. Disney acquired the film rights to the novel from Metro-Goldwyn-Mayer, which had been planning on producing its own adaptation, in 1949. Disney decided to film the production in the United Kingdom with financial assistance from RKO so both could use "frozen" funds from ticket sales of their films released in Britain, which were required to be spent on film productions in the country.

Exterior scenes were shot in Cornwall (River Fa), Falmouth, Carrick Roads, Gull Rick and Helford River), Devon (cliff scenes), Bristol (wharf), and Iver Heath in Buckinghamshire. Interiors were filmed at Denham Film Studios, Denham, Buckinghamshire. The ship scenes were filmed aboard the Ryelands, a real-life schooner from the 19th century.

The casting of Bobby Driscoll, the film's only American actor, violated British labour laws as he did not have a Ministry of Labour permit to work in the country and additionally, was two years younger than the minimum to obtain one. A court in Beaconsfield fined Driscoll, his father, and Walt Disney Productions £100 each, and prohibited Driscoll from further work on the film. Still, Disney completed Driscoll's scenes and sent him back to the United States while his case was under appeal. The appeals court ruled that Disney had "brazenly flouted British law" by doing this.

Reception
Reviews from critics were mostly positive. Thomas M. Pryor of The New York Times called the film "a grand and glorious entertainment" that "captures the true spirit of the novel." Variety praised the film for its "sumptuous" set pieces and "a virtual tour de force" performance by Newton. Sonia Stein of The Washington Post wrote that the film was "like a treasure chest of precious stones," with "some of the most beautiful color photography ever shot." Harrison's Reports called it a "first-rate adventure melodrama that should thrill young and old alike," while Philip Hamburger of The New Yorker called it "absolutely first-class ... mounted in Technicolor with such meticulous and imaginative care that I had the feeling throughout that I was watching a handsome illustrated edition of the book come to life." The Monthly Film Bulletin was less positive, however, calling the production values "serviceable rather than imaginative" and finding Driscoll to be "unmistakably 20th century-American in this context," and "insufficiently an actor to have much of a shot at Jim."

Box-office
The film returned rentals to RKO from its initial release of $4,100,000 with $2,100,000 being generated in the United States and Canada.

The film was the sixth most popular movie at the British box office in 1950. According to Kinematograph Weekly the 'biggest winners' at the box office in 1950 Britain were The Blue Lamp, The Happiest Days of Your Life, Annie Get Your Gun, The Wooden Horse, Treasure Island and Odette, with "runners up" being Stage Fright, White Heat, They Were Not Divided, Trio, Morning Departure, Destination Moon, Sands of Iwo Jima, Little Women, The Forsythe Saga, Father of the Bride, Neptune's Daughter, The Dancing Years, The Red Light, Rogues of Sherwood Forest, Fancy Pants, Copper Canyon, State Secret, The Cure for Love, My Foolish Heart, Stromboli, Cheaper by the Dozen, Pinky, Three Came Home, Broken Arrow and Black Rose.

Sequel
In 1954, Newton reprised his role of Long John Silver in a non-Disney sequel also directed by Haskin, Long John Silver (this, incidentally, was the first CinemaScope film to be shot in Australia), and went on to play Silver again in a television series, The Adventures of Long John Silver (made 1954–55), also shot at Pagewood Studios Sydney, made before Australia had television.

Re-releases, re-editing, and home media

Walt Disney Productions re-released the film to US theaters in 1975. It had to be submitted to the MPAA to receive a rating; they gave the film a PG. At the time, Disney had a G-only policy that would not be relaxed for another four years to allow PG-rated films, so they cut the film to receive a G rating. Those cuts totaled 9 minutes, bringing the film's running time down to 87 minutes.

The film came out on videotape in the US in 1981, 1985, 1991, 1996, and 1997, and on laserdisc in 1983 and 1992. While the original videotape and laserdisc releases contained the 87-minute G-rated version, by the early 1990s the studio had restored the original theatrical cut with a PG rating, as several Disney-branded releases had already been rated PG by this point, and every release since 1991, including the 2003 DVD release, has been the uncut 96-minute version. The film was released on Blu-ray through the Disney Movie Club in 2015.

The film was available to stream on Disney+ when the service launched on November 12, 2019.

Comic book adaptation
 Dell Four Color #624 (April 1955)

See alsoReturn to Treasure Island'', a 10-part 1986 Disney Channel sequel co-produced by Disney with HTV and starring Brian Blessed as Long John Silver.
 1950 in film
 List of American films of 1950
 List of Walt Disney Pictures films

References

External links
 Radio Times review
 
 
 
 
 
 
 Treasure Island, a one-hour radio drama based on the film on Lux Radio Theater, January 29, 1951, starring James Mason and Bobby Driscoll.

1950 films
1950s children's adventure films
American children's adventure films
British children's adventure films
1950s English-language films
Treasure Island films
Films set in 1765
Walt Disney Pictures films
Films directed by Byron Haskin
Films produced by Perce Pearce
Films produced by Walt Disney
Films scored by Clifton Parker
Films set in England
Films adapted into comics
Films shot at Denham Film Studios
Films shot in Bristol
Films shot in Cornwall
Films shot in Devon
Fictional places in Disney films
1950s American films
1950s British films